is a railway station  in the town of Mogami, Yamagata, Japan, operated by East Japan Railway Company (JR East).

Lines
Sakaida Station is served by the Rikuu East Line, and is located 55.3 rail kilometers from the terminus of the line at Kogota Station.

Station layout
The station has one platform, serving a bidirectional single track. The platform was originally an island platform, but there are no longer any tracks on one side. The station is unattended.

History
Sakaida Station opened on November 1, 1917. The station was absorbed into the JR East network upon the privatization of JNR on April 1, 1987.

Surrounding area

See also
List of railway stations in Japan

External links

  JR East Station information 

Railway stations in Yamagata Prefecture
Rikuu East Line
Railway stations in Japan opened in 1917
Mogami, Yamagata